Botswana Telecommunications Corporation (BTC) is a telecommunications and Internet service provider in Botswana, and is headquartered in Gaborone. It provides telecommunications services throughout the country.

The company was formerly a government entity but is now a public entity listed on the Botswana Stock Exchange as Botswana Telecommunications Limited (BTCL).

History
BTC was established in 1980 to provide, develop, operate and manage Botswana's national and international telecommunications services. BTC is a parastatal in which the Botswana government holds 100% equity. BTC was the only telecommunications provider in Botswana until 1996 when an amendment of the BTC Act removed the monopoly of BTC and allowed indirect competition from two cellular companies, Mascom and Orange Botswana

BTC's network is composed of an all-digital microwave and fibre optic system with digital exchanges at the main centres. The current network comprises 7,300 kilometres of microwave radio and fibre optic links between 12 main processors, each serving a specific area of the country. The switching units have a capacity of about 117 000 lines. Current services provided include national and international telephony, managed and data networks, very small aperture terminal (VSAT), private wires, leased circuits, toll free services, Internet, paging, public telephones, voice messaging, telex, packet switching, telegraph and customer premises.

BTC works closely with the two major mobile operators in Botswana namely Mascom and Orange Botswana. In 2008 BTC established a mobile arm, beMOBILE. On 1 November 2012 BTC was converted to and registered as a public company, Botswana Telecommunications Corporation Limited (BTCL).

BTCL also provides virtual telephony services, paging and data communication for corporate networks.

Corporate governance
Current members of the board of directors of BTCL are:
 Lorato Boakgomo – Ntakhwana – Chairman of the board
 Anthony Masunga – Managing Director
 Gerald Nthebolan – Member
 Serty Leburu – Member
 Alan Boshwaen – Member
 Choice Pitso – Member
 Professor Rejoice Tsheko – Member
 Maclean Letshwiti

BTCL Senior Corporate Officers:
 Anthony Masunga –  Managing Director
 Mmamotse Monageng General Shared Services and Human Resources 
 Abel Bogatsu – General Manager Finance
 Kaelo Radira – Company Secretary 
 Bambino Masoko – General Manager Sales
 Pilot Yane – General Manager Marketing(A)
 Goitseone Tshiamiso – General Manager Customer Care(A)
 Christopher M. Diswai – General Manager Strategy
 Thabo Nkala – General Manager Technology
 Mokgethi Nyatseng – General Manager Wholesale
 Same Kgosiemang – General Manager Internal Audit

Products and services
For many years, BTC has been Botswana's largest supplier of fixed-line and associated communications services, and it has been providing telephony and other products to urban and rural centres across the country. The following main products and services are currently offered by BTC:

Residential
 Payphones, Prepaid cards, BTC prepaid, BTC ADSL of up to speeds of 50 Mbps and Postpaid and Prepaid LTE of speeds up to 150 Mbit/s.

Business
Internet (Botsgate), Frame Relay, ADSL, Internet Products, Data Services and Leased Lines, ISDN

Customer Premises Equipment
 Telephone Instruments, PABX

Value Added Services (or VANS)
 Abbreviated Dialling, Alarm Call, Caller ID, Call Barring, Call Diversion, Call Waiting, Conference Call, Time announcement, Toll Free, Voice Mail, Itemised Billing

Tariffs
 Installation and Rental, Prepaid, Operator Assisted, Toll Free, International pre-paid and postpaid, Postpaid, Public Phones and Scratch'n Dial, Service Call, International Payphones, ISDB BRI

Media Release 

Botswana telecommunications corporation has embarked in a network transformation projects in its quest to Improve service quality and provision of superior customer experience.

BTC Broadband 
BTC offers high speed, capped and uncapped Broadband Internet connection of up to 50 Mbps. This is made possible through various technologies within the BTC network.

Financial
In June 2016 BTCL published its first annual financial statements as a public company for the financial year end 31 March 2016. The company reported a loss of P371 million which was due to an impairment write down of P522 million, and had revenue of P1.512 billion which was a marginal increase from previous year. Total assets were at P1.949 billion while cash and cash equivalents was at P390 million. The company also declared a dividend of 5 thebe per share

Subsequent to these results the share price started its decline from its high of P1.30 to P0.85 per share on 15 September 2016.

Timelines

Commitments
On 2 February 2010 Powertel Communications signed a Cross-Border Interconnection Agreement with Botswana Telecommunications Corporation. BTC agreed to provide Powertel with international bandwidth capacity for two years after the two organisations completed cross border fibre optic connections at Ramokgwebana in December 2009.

BTC is currently providing 45Mbit/s to Zambia.

BTC has committed to contribute P504 million to secure reliable bandwidth connection from an undersea fibre optic through the West African Cable System (WACS). BTC and Telecom Namibia both contribute equally as second tiers while regional giants like Vodacom, MTN, Neotel and Zain will contribute US$100 million (approximately P672 million) each for the development of the undersea cable that will link London with Africa.

BTC is also committed US$210 million into the Eastern Africa Submarine Cable System (EASSy) to further increase Botswana's bandwidth capacity.

BTC to be privatized
In June 2010, the government of Botswana government planned to privatize BTC. The Sunday Standard reported that Presidential Affairs Minister, Lesego Motsumi told parliament that the cabinet has taken a decision regarding the privatization structure of BTC and the information will be communicated with all stakeholders soon. Lesego Motsumi stated that the aim of the privatization was to minimize risks, and get maximum benefits. She added that the government had to carry out extensive consultations before going ahead with the plans.

BTCL listing 
BTCL listed on the Botswana Stock Exchange on 8 April 2016 at P1 per share and total valuation of P1.05 billion (1.05 billion shares). The listing was muchly awaited and was oversubscribed but individual citizen were given preference over company. The shares were allocated 51% to the government of Botswana, 5% to employees of BTCL and 44% to Batswana and Botswana companies. The shares were largely restricted for the benefit of Batswana and are traded among Batswana and companies benefiting for Batswana e.g. funds managers.

The share price spiked on listing and continued its to rise to high of P1.30 per share then subsequently declined upon announcements of financial year results of a P371 million loss. The share is currently trading at P0.85 per share 15 September 2016.

It was announced that Paul Taylor, who had led BTCL to its transformation and subsequent listing would not have his contract renewed at end of his contract which ended in July 2016. Anthony Masunga was then appointed acting managing director.
On 1 November 2012, Botswana Telecommunications Corporation ( BTC ) was converted from a statutory body into a public company limited by shares, in accordance with the Transition Act and Companies Act, and renamed Botswana Telecommunications Corporation Limited.

References

External links
http://www.btc.bw/themes/btc/assets/documents/Final%20BTC%202019%20Annual%20Report.pdf
https://www.weekendpost.co.bw/20695/business/btc-invests-60-million-pula-to-enhance-internet-speed-quality/

1980 establishments in Botswana
Botswana companies
Companies listed on the Botswana Stock Exchange
Internet service providers of Botswana
Telecommunications companies established in 1980
Telecommunications companies of Botswana